Lebia abdominalis is a species of beetle in the family Carabidae. It is found in Belize, Guatemala, Mexico, Nicaragua, on Jamaica and in the United States.

References

Further reading

 
 
 
 

Lebia
Beetles described in 1843
Beetles of Central America
Beetles of the United States